MacDonald Park may refer to:
 MacDonald Park, South Australia, a northern suburb of Adelaide
 MacDonald Park (British Columbia), a football stadium in Victoria, home to the James Bay Athletic Association Rugby Union team